Francis McNamara or Francis MacNamara may refer to: 

Frank the Poet (ca. 1810–1861), born Frances MacNamara, Irish convict imprisoned in Australia who wrote poetry about his experiences while imprisoned
Francis Knyvett McNamara (1912–1992), English cricketer
Francis Terry McNamara (born 1927), U.S. diplomat
Francis Macnamara (1802–1873), Member of Parliament for Clare and for Killybegs

See also
Frank McNamara (disambiguation)